Apollon Larissa Football Club is a Greek professional football club based in Filippoupoli, Larissa, Greece. The club plays in the Gamma Ethniki, the third tier of the Greek football league system. It plays its home matches at the Philippoupoli Ground.

History
Apollon Larissa is one of the oldest and most historic groups that were created in the city of Larissa. The club was founded in 1930 by students of the Averofius Farm School of Larissa in a rural settlement of the city of Philipoupoli and its first name was "Dimitra". The name "Apollon" the team took it in 1952. Its colours are blue and white. Twelve years later, in 1964, Apollon Larissa managed and played it for the first time in Greek second division, but did not win a league match at that level. The club also had a fine run in the 1997–98 Greek Cup, reaching the quarterfinals. There followed several years of "drought" in the local championship of Larissa and Delta Ethniki, but in the late 1980s and especially in the early and mid 1990s the team made an excellent run in Gamma Ethniki, giving very good football.
In the Greek Cup, Apollon Larissa biggest distinction was the 1997–98 season when they reached the quarter-finals, where they were eliminated by Iraklis.
Apollon Larissa has shown many remarkable players that some of them wore the shirt of National Hellas and played in foreign tournaments such as Nikos Patsiavouras, Kostas Kolomitrosisis, Vaios Athanasiou, Nikos Michopoulos, Pavlos Adamos, Stelios Hassiotis and Tasos Venetis.
This is also contributed by the fact that the club owns athletic facilities in the city of Filippoupoli, where the team has a capacity of about 5,000 spectators.
In May 2011, Apollon Larissa was relegated to the regionalized fifth level of Greek football, ending a period of 31 years in the national third and fourth divisions. In 2016, they were promoted to Gamma Ethniki for the second time in the history of the club since 1964.
In the 2014–15 season, Apollon Larissa will fight for many years in the A1 category of Larissa (local category), which they departed until next season.
The demobilization of the team resulted in the team being born again from its ashes and the administration was flanked by young people with a desire to work and with the aim of returning the team directly to the local class and at the same time organizing all the departments of the Academy today it has about 150 children.

Honours

Domestic

Leagues
 Third Division
 Winners (1): 2016–17
 FCA Larissa Championship
 Winners (5): 1963–64, 1971–72, 1973–74, 1978–79, 2015–16

Cups
 FCA Larissa Cup
 Winners (7): 1980–81, 1985–86, 1987–88, 1998–99, 2000–01, 2001–02, 2015–16

Players

Current squad

Team statistics

Season to season

References

External links
Official website

 
Football clubs in Thessaly
Association football clubs established in 1930
1930 establishments in Greece
Super League Greece 2 clubs